Tressell may refer to:
 Robert Tressell, a British writer
 Tressell Ward, a local government ward in Hastings, East Sussex, named after the writer

See also
 Tressel (disambiguation)